Revise or revised may refer to:

Bibles
 Revised Version of the King James Bible
 New Revised Standard Version of the King James Bible

Government and law
 Revised Penal Code of the Philippines
 Revised Statutes of the United States

Other uses
 Revised Julian calendar
 Revised New General Catalogue, an astronomy catalog
 Revised Romanization of Korean

See also
 Revisable-Form Text
 Revision (disambiguation)